Okiki Afolabi (born 12 December 1994 in Ibadan, Nigeria) is a Nigerian professional footballer who plays as a forward for  Newroz Sport Club , Iraqi Premier League . He formerly played for Egyptian side Ismaily SC . He was part of the Nigeria U-20 and U-23 country selected.

Biography

Sunshine Stars F.C
He began his career in the Sunshine Stars F.C. in Nigeria Premier League, he managed to convert 13 goals in 17 games played.

Talleres
In August 2016, Okiki was tested at argentine Racing Club playing for Argentine Primera División. However, he decided to emigrate to Cordoba and play for Talleres. After a couple of weeks of trial, he was accepted into the institution and Okiki became part of the first team. He was signed for one year with a purchase option.

Jimma Aba Jifar F.C. 
Afolabi signed for Ethiopian Premier League debutantes Jimma Aba Jifar F.C. at the start of the 2017/18 season. He enjoyed a very successful debut season with the club securing top goal scorer honors (23) and helping the club win its first ever title.

Ismaily SC 
After a wonderful season in Ethiopia league he achieved the top scorer award and the most valuable player. Okiki drew the attention of some clubs and he received a lot of offers but he preferred to sign 4 years contract with the Egyptian giant Ismaily SC.

Honours
Talleres de Córdoba
Primera B Nacional: 2016
Jimma Aba Jifar F.C.
Ethiopian Premier League: 2017-18
Top Goal Scorer-23 goals: 2017-18

References

External links
Okiki Afolabi at Footballdatabase

1994 births
Living people
Nigerian footballers
Nigerian expatriate footballers
Sunshine Stars F.C. players
Talleres de Córdoba footballers
Jimma Aba Jifar F.C. players
Mekelle 70 Enderta F.C. players
Fasil Kenema S.C. players
Argentine Primera División players
Nigeria Professional Football League players
Ethiopian Premier League players
Expatriate footballers in Argentina
Association football forwards
Nigerian expatriate sportspeople in Argentina
Sportspeople from Ibadan
People from Oyo State